The Shenyang–Dandong railway or Shendan Railway is a China Railway line connecting the Liaoning cities of Shenyang and Dandong, with an onward connection to Sinŭiju Ch'ŏngnyŏn Station in Sinŭiju, North Korea, on the P'yŏngŭi Line of the Korean State Railway. It is the most important of the railway lines connecting China with the DPRK.

History
The line from Andong (now Dandong) to Fengtian (now Shenyang) was originally built by the Imperial Japanese Army as a  narrow-gauge rail line during the Russo-Japanese War. Later, it was transferred to the South Manchuria Railway (Mantetsu), which named it the Anfeng Line (Anpō Line with the official Japanese name) after the two termini (Fengtian being pronounced Hōten in Japanese); the travel time for passenger trains between Andong and Fengtian was two days. In accordance with the agreement signed between Japan and China after the end of the war, work to convert the line from narrow to standard gauge began in August 1909 and was completed in October 1911. On 1 November 1911, the Yalu River Bridge was completed, connecting the line, and Mantetsu, to the Gyeongui Line of the Chosen Government Railway. The Anpō Line connected to Mantetsu's Renkyō Line at Fengtian. Double tracking of the line was completed in September 1944.

The line was heavily damaged during the Pacific War; after the defeat of Japan, it was, along with all other railway lines in the territory of the former Manchukuo, taken over by the Soviet-controlled China Changchun Railway. In 1955, the Soviets returned control of the railways in Dongbei, and the line became part of the China Railway. Reconstruction of the line as a single-track line was completed in 1953, and it was renamed Shen'an Railway, after Fengtian was renamed Shenyang. After Andong was renamed Dandong in 1965 the line was once again renamed, receiving its current name at that time. At present, the Sujiatun–Benxi–Nanfen and Qijiabao–Caohekou sections of the line are double tracked, but work is underway to double the entire line.

In 2015, a new line was completed between Dandong and Jinshanwan, which allows passenger trains to bypass Hamatang and Shahezhen completely.

Route

References

Railway lines in China
Standard gauge railways in China
Railway lines in Manchukuo
Mantetsu railway lines
Railway lines opened in 1905
1905 establishments in China